Hugh Roach (born 11 September 1992) is an Australian rugby union professional player who plays hooker for the Chicago Hounds of Major League Rugby (MLR) in the United States. He also plays for the USA Perpignan of Top 14 (France).

Family and early life
Roach was born in Sydney. He played his junior rugby at Hunters Hill Rugby Club, and attended Newington College. His father, Graham Roach, was also a first grade rugby player who played at hooker for Western Suburbs in the Shute Shield competition.

Roach was an Australia Schoolboys representative in 2009 and 2010, and is currently the equal most capped schools rugby player in Australia. He was also a member of the Australia Under 20 side for both the 2011 where he made 3 appearances (Fiji, Samoa, New Zealand) and 2012 IRB Junior World Championships where he was capped a further 4 times ( Scotland, Argentina, France twice).

Rugby career
Roach initially made his name playing for Eastwood in the Shute Shield competition and was named Shute Shield Rookie of the Year after the 2013 tournament.  This good form saw him picked by the Western Force for their match against the British and Irish Lions in June 2013.

He made the Waratahs extended playing squad for the 2014 Super Rugby season as third-choice hooker behind Tatafu Polota-Nau and Tolu Latu.

The 2015 season brought further success on the field with Roach earning a further 6 Super Rugby caps for the Waratahs .In the domestic club competition, he added another Shute Shield grand final win (his second in three GF appearances) in a performance that saw him voted the Man of the Match by the TV broadcast team.

The 2016 season saw Roach earn a further 13 appearances for the Waratahs. With a total of 21 super appearances under his belt the Tahs prioritized the re-signing of Roach in June 2016 committing him for a further 2 seasons at Moore Park. In 2017 he earned a further 9 caps for the Waratahs taking his career total Super rugby caps to 30 at the conclusion of the 2017 season.

2019 saw a move to Melbourne Rebels where Roach added a further 8 super caps to his record taking his total to 49. He took up a playing contract with Tasman Mako in New Zealand's Mitre 10 Cup later that year where he played 10 games then signed a contract to play for London Irish in the UK Premiership but that was terminated because of Roach having a foot injury.

References

1992 births
People educated at Newington College
Australian rugby union players
New South Wales Waratahs players
Greater Sydney Rams players
Rugby union hookers
Rugby union players from Sydney
Living people
Tasman rugby union players
Melbourne Rebels players
Australian expatriate rugby union players
Expatriate rugby union players in New Zealand
Crusaders (rugby union) players
Expatriate rugby union players in the United States
Austin Gilgronis players
USA Perpignan players
Chicago Hounds (rugby union) players